was a Japanese professional sumo wrestler from Tōda (now Wakuya), Miyagi Prefecture. He wrestled for Izutsu stable and achieved the rank of ōzeki before dying while as an active wrestler in April 1914.

History
Born on December 13, 1880 in Miyagi Prefecture, he was introduced to sumo by Izutsu (yokozuna Nishinoumi Kajirō) when a group led by Konishiki and Asashio Tarō came on a tour in his hometown in 1897. He was promoted in juryō in the January 1902 tournament, and in May 1903 he entered the makuuchi division. Komagatake had a rivalry with Tachiyama Mineemon since their joint makushita debut. Their matchs are said to have been particulary populars, to the point that their period of rivalry gave its name to this era, therefore known as the "Koma-Tachi era". Komagatake was promoted to komusubi in January 1905 and sekiwake in May of the same year. He later earned the nickname , meaning 'Enma's salted fish' after a Japanese saying comparing bitter grins to the difficult face of Enma, who chewed on a bug as if he had tasted salted fish. Komagatake competed with Tachiyama for promotion to ōzeki and was promoted before him in the January 1907 tournament. Hitachiyama Taniemon took particular care of Komagatake and trained him diligently.

He was expected to be promoted to yokozuna, and it was said that he would assume the shikona, or ring name, "Tanikaze", which was supposed to be his legacy since the eponymous yokozuna was also from Miyagi Prefecture. He was known as a good opponent for Tachiyama until Tachiyama became ōzeki, but after Tachiyama was promoted to yokozuna, Komagatake fell behind.

Komagatake was known as a glutton and heavy drinker. In his later years, he drank so much that his body broke down, and when his strength declined and he was defeated, he drank heavily, and after each drink, he became worse, and he even recorded a losing record. On April 11, 1914, while on a tour in Ibaraki Prefecture, he stopped at a liquor store and drank cheap fermented sake, resulting in intestinal perforation and cerebral hemorrhage. Komagatake died suddenly at the age of 33.A life-size panel is dedicated to Komagatake in the premises of the Wakuya castle, in Miyagi Prefecture. A stone monument was also erected in the Great Temple Sakuragaoka in Sendai.

Fighting style
Komagatake was popular for his dynamic wrestling. He made advantage of his muscular and tall body body and was good at throwing and thrusting techniques.

Top Division Record

See also
Glossary of sumo terms
List of past sumo wrestlers
List of ōzeki

References 

1880 births
Japanese sumo wrestlers
Sumo people from Miyagi Prefecture
Ōzeki
1914 deaths
Sumo wrestlers who died while active